Anna Alexandra "Minnie" Weisz (born December 1972) is an English photographer and visual artist. She specialises in the camera obscura and adapts the technique to turn entire rooms into cameras.

Early life and family
Weisz was born in London. Her father, George Weisz (1929–2020), was a Hungarian Jewish mechanical engineer. Her mother, Edith Ruth (née Teich; 1932–2016), was a teacher-turned-psychotherapist from Vienna, Austria. Her parents left for the United Kingdom around 1938, before the outbreak of the Second World War, to escape the Nazis. Scholar Rev. James Parkes helped her mother and her mother's family leave Austria for England. Her mother's ancestry is Austrian-Jewish, Catholic Viennese and Italian; Weisz's mother formally converted to Judaism upon marrying Weisz's father.

Weisz's maternal grandfather was Alexander Teich, a Jewish activist who had been a secretary of the World Union of Jewish Students. Her older sister, Rachel Weisz, is an Academy Award-winning actress.

Career
Weisz received an MA in Communication Art and Design at the Royal College of Art and a BA in Graphic and Media Design at London College of Printing.

She specialises in the camera obscura and adapts the technique to turn entire rooms into cameras, across Europe. She has described herself (with respect to her artistic activity) as an architectural detective.

Exhibitions
King's Cross Stories, exhibition and film, Great Northern Hotel, part of the Arrivals season, King's Cross, London, 14–17 November 2007.
The Diary of a derelict Dairy, The Express Dairy Depot, Bloomsbury (prior to re-development), 20 June – 20 July 2008, part of the London Festival of Architecture. Weisz curated the exhibition of works upon the subject of buildings and their stories of Bloomsbury.
Ubi sunt, 2011.

Publications

Editor with Rizzoli International Publications: 
A Picture History of the Grenvilles of Rosedale House by Mary Yelloly. Lyndsey Stainton. Preface by Simon Finch, Helena Bonham-Carter. Designed and edited by Weisz, 2007.
Narciso Rodriguez by Betsy Berne. Co-edited by Weisz, 2008.
Norman Parkinson A Very British Glamour by Louise Baring. Designed by Lee Swillingham/Suburbia. Edited by Weisz, 2009.
Matthew Williamson by Colin McDowell. Edited by Weisz, 2010.
WKW The Cinema of Wong Kar Wai by John Powers. Co-edited by Weisz, 2016.

References

External links 
 

1972 births
Living people
Date of birth missing (living people)
Photographers from London
People educated at North London Collegiate School
English women photographers
English women artists
English people of Austrian descent
English people of Italian descent
British Jews